Auke Mountain is a mountain in the city and borough of Juneau, Alaska, United States. It is a part of the Boundary Ranges of the Coast Mountains in western North America.

The mountain is named after the local Auke people; the name was first published by the United States Geological Survey (USGS) in 1912.

See also
Tolch Rock

References

Boundary Ranges
Mountains of Alaska
Mountains of Juneau, Alaska